Mising or Mishing may refer to:
Mising people
Mising language

See also 
Missing (disambiguation)

Language and nationality disambiguation pages